Gaming for Gold is a novel by Australian writer Arthur Wright which was published in England. It is about a New Zealand racehorse that participates in the Melbourne Cup.

"The novel is not a convincing picture of Australian conditions", said the critic from the Advertiser.

References

External links
Gaming for Gold at AustLit

1929 Australian novels
Australian sports novels
Horse racing novels
Novels set in Melbourne